Windham-Ashland-Jewett Central School (WAJ) is the only school in the Windham-Ashland-Jewett public school School District in the area of Windham, in Greene County, New York, U.S.A. It is a K-12 school, which encompasses all grades from kindergarten through 12th grade.

As of 2012, of the district/school's 411 students, 23% were classified as "poor"; 93% were white, 5% Hispanic, 1% Asian; less than 1/2 of 1% were African-American.

For the 2016-17 school year, of the 292 students, 85.3% were white, 7.6% Hispanic, 2.4% Asian; 1.4% black, and 4.1% two or more races.  28.4% of the students were eligible for free lunch, with an additional 3.8% eligible for reduced-price lunch.

The WAJ boys downhill alpine ski team were the 2013 New York State champions.

Notable alumni 

 Scott Adams, creator of the Dilbert comic strip, and the author of several nonfiction works of satire, commentary, and business.

Footnotes

External links 
official website

Schools in Greene County, New York
Public high schools in New York (state)
Public middle schools in New York (state)
Public elementary schools in New York (state)